Tearjerker is something that provokes sadness or pathos, as the name suggests.
Tearjerker may refer to:
 "Tearjerker" (American Dad!), a 2008 episode of American Dad!
 "Tearjerker" (song), a 1995 song by Red Hot Chili Peppers
 "Tearjerker", a song from Korn's 2005 album See You on the Other Side
 Tearjerker (band), a band from Toronto, Canada

See also
 Melodrama